Palmoliparis beckeri, the gloved snailfish, is a species of snailfish found around the northern Kuril Islands in the northwestern Pacific Ocean. This species grows to a length of  TL though more usually around  TL. This species is the only known member of its genus.

References

Liparidae
Monotypic fish genera
Fish described in 1996